Sarah Elizabeth Monette (born November 25, 1974) is an American novelist and short story author, writing mostly in the genres of fantasy and horror. Under the name Katherine Addison, she published the fantasy novel The Goblin Emperor, which received the Locus Award for Best Fantasy Novel and was nominated for the Nebula, Hugo and World Fantasy Awards.

Early life

Monette was born in Oak Ridge, Tennessee on November 25, 1974. She began writing at the age of 12.

Monette studied Classics, English, and French at Case Western Reserve University and graduated summa cum laude in 1996. She received her master's degree in 1997 and her Ph.D. in 2004, both in English literature at the University of Wisconsin–Madison. She specialized in Renaissance Drama and writing her dissertation on ghosts in English Renaissance revenge tragedy.

Career
Monette won the Spectrum award in 2003 for her short story "Three Letters from the Queen of Elfland". Her first novel Mélusine was published by Ace Books in August 2005, earning starred reviews in Publishers Weekly and Booklist and a place in Locus'''s Recommended Reading list for 2005. The sequel, The Virtu, followed in July 2006, also earning starred reviews and making Locus's Recommended Reading lists for 2006.

Her short stories have been published in Strange Horizons, Alchemy, and Lady Churchill's Rosebud Wristlet, among other venues, and have received four Honorable Mentions from The Year's Best Fantasy and Horror, edited by Ellen Datlow, Gavin Grant, and Kelly Link. Her poem "Night Train: Heading West" appeared in The Year's Best Fantasy and Horror XIX, and a story she co-wrote with 2005 Campbell winner Elizabeth Bear, "The Ile of Dogges", appeared in The Year's Best Science Fiction, edited by Gardner Dozois, in 2007. She also has been published in the award-winning Postscripts.

In 2007, she donated her archives to the department of Rare Books and Special Collections at Northern Illinois University.

Her 2014 novel The Goblin Emperor  was published under the pseudonym Katherine Addison. The novel received the Locus Award for Best Fantasy Novel and was nominated for the Nebula, Hugo and World Fantasy Awards.

Bibliography
Novels
Doctrine of Labyrinths series

 

Iskryne series

Standalone novels
Published as Katherine Addison

Cemeteries of Amalo series
Published as Katherine Addison

Short fiction
Kyle Murchison Booth
"The Wall of Clouds" (Alchemy Magazine 1, December 2003)
"The Inheritance of Barnabas Wilcox" (Lovecraft's Weird Mysteries 7, May 2004)
"The Venebretti Necklace" (Alchemy Magazine 2, September 2004)
"Bringing Helena Back" (All Hallows: The Journal of the Ghost Story Society 35, February 2004)
"The Green Glass Paperweight" (Tales of the Unanticipated 25, August 2004)
"Wait for Me" (Naked Snake Online, September 2004)
"Elegy for a Demon Lover" (Tales of the Unanticipated 26, October 2005)
"Drowning Palmer" (All Hallows: The Journal of the Ghost Story Society 41, February 2006)
"The Bone Key" (SAY... What's the Combination?, May 2007)
"Listening to Bone" (The Bone Key, Prime Books, 2007)
"The World Without Sleep" (Postscripts, Spring 2008)
"The Yellow Dressing Gown" (Weird Tales, March 2008)
"The Replacement" (The Willows, September 2008)
"White Charles" (Clarkesworld Magazine, September 2009)
"Unnatural Creatures" (Unnatural Creatures, self-published, 2011)
"To Die for Moonlight" (Apex Magazine, July 2013)
"The Testimony of Dragon's Teeth" (Uncanny Magazine, March 2018)
"The Haunting of Dr. Claudius Winterson" (Uncanny Magazine, January 2022)

Boojum
"Boojum" (with Elizabeth Bear) (Fast Ships, Black Sails, eds. Jeff and Ann VanderMeer, Night Shade Books, 2008)
"Mongoose" (with Elizabeth Bear) (2009)
"The Wreck of the Charles Dexter Ward" (with Elizabeth Bear) (2012)

Other short fiction
"Three Letters from the Queen of Elflands" (Lady Churchill's Rosebud Wristlet #11, November 2002)
"Queen of Swords " (Alienskin Magazine #2.4, November 2003)
"Sidhe Tigers" (Lady Churchill's Rosebud Wristlet #13, November 2003)
"Straw " (Strange Horizons #28, June 2004)
"The Half-Sister" (Lady Churchill's Rosebud Wristlet #15, January 2005)
"The Séance at Chisholm End" (Alchemy Magazine #3, January 2006)
"A Gift of Wings" The Queen in Winter Ace Books, 2006
"The Ile of Dogges" (with Elizabeth Bear) (Aeon #7, May 2006)
"A Night in Electric Squidland" (Lone Star Stories #15, June 2006)
"Katabasis: Seraphic Trains" (Tales of the Unanticipated #27, July 2006)
"National Geographic On Assignment: Mermaids of the Old West" (Fictitious Force #2, July 2006)
"Draco campestris " (Strange Horizons, August 7, 2006)
"Letter from a Teddy Bear on Veterans' Day" (Ideomancer 5.3, September 2006)
"A Light in Troy" (Clarkesworld Magazine #1, October 2006)
"Amante Dorée" (Paradox Magazine #10, Winter 2006/07)
"The Watcher in the Corners" (author's blog, Notes from the Labyrinth, April 23, 2007)
"Somewhere Beneath Those Waves Was Her Home" (Fantasy Magazine, July 2007)
"Under the Beansidhe's Pillow" (Lone Star Stories #22, August 1, 2007)
"Festival Lives, View 3: All God's Chillun Got Wings" (2008)
"Darkness, as a Bride" (Cemetery Dance #58, February 2008)
"Fiddleback Ferns" (Flytrap #9, June 2008)
"Night Train: Heading West" (poem) (The Year's Best Fantasy & Horror: Nineteenth Annual Collection, August 2008)
"Last Drink Bird Head" (2009)
"After the Dragon" (Fantasy Magazine, January 2010)
"Ashes, Ashes" (All Hallows: The Journal of the Ghost Story Society, 2011)
"No Man's Land" (Fictitious Force, 2011)
"The Devil in Gaylord's Creek" (2011)
"Why Do You Linger?" (2011)
"Absent from Felicity" (Somewhere Beneath Those Waves, 2011)
"Impostors" (Somewhere Beneath Those Waves, 2011)
"Blue Lace Agate" (2012)
"Coyote Gets His Own Back" (2012)
"The Half-Life of Angels" (2015)
"Learning to See Dragons" (2017)
"National Geographic on Assignment: The Unicorn Enclosure" (2017)
"The Oracle of Abbey Road (Blackbird Singing in the Dead of Night)" (2018)

CollectionsThe Bone Key (Prime Books, 2007)Somewhere Beneath Those Waves'' (Prime Books, 2011)

References

External links

 
The Sarah Monette Papers at Northern Illinois University
 Sarah Monette at Fantasy Literature

 
 Katherine Addison at LC Authorities, with 1 record

Living people
21st-century American novelists
American fantasy writers
American horror writers
American women short story writers
American women novelists
People from Oak Ridge, Tennessee
Women science fiction and fantasy writers
Women horror writers
21st-century American women writers
21st-century American short story writers
Weird fiction writers
Case Western Reserve University alumni
University of Wisconsin–Madison alumni
1974 births